Ahmad Abughaush (Arabic: أحمد أبو غوش; born 1 February 1996) is a Jordanian taekwondo athlete. He won the gold medal in the 68 kg category at the 2016 Olympics. This was Jordan's first Olympic medal in any sport, excluding a bronze in 1988 when taekwondo was a demonstration sport.

Biography
Abughaush was born in Amman, Jordan. His father is of Palestinian descent, his grandparents having been relocated from the town of Abu Ghosh to Jordan decades earlier.

Abughaush started Taekwondo at a local training center in Amman, his skills qualified him for inclusion in the national team. In 2010, he participated in the Taekwondo World Championship for juniors that was held in Sharm el-Sheikh, where he was the only Arab athlete to achieve a gold medal. The year later he competed as an elite at the 2011 World Taekwondo Championships in the men's finweight event and was beaten by Meisam Bagheri in the 16th finals. He participated in a number of more championships and was given the best Jordanian athlete award by the Jordan Olympic Committee in 2012. Abugaush took a year off in 2013 after he had suffered a rupture in the cruciate ligament, he soon returned to training and won gold medals in a number of international championships in 2014.

2016 Summer Olympics
Abughaush competed at the 2016 Summer Olympics in Rio de Janeiro, in the men's 68 kg, where he won the gold medal, defeating Alexey Denisenko from Russia. This was Jordan's first ever Olympic medal. Abughaush told the press "it's an indescribable feeling to win the first medal in the history of Jordan in all the sports" and said "it's also a great feeling to listen to the national anthem of Jordan being played in Rio in front of the whole world."

In an interview with Ro'ya TV, Abughaush's parents said that "Ahmad's accomplishment is an honour to Jordan". They went on to thank the Jordan Olympic Committee and the Jordanian Royal family for their support, namely King Abdullah II, Crown Prince Hussein and Prince Ali. King Abdullah and Prince Hussein personally called Abughaush to congratulate him on his accomplishment, while Prince Ali, who is well known for sponsoring sports in Jordan, had also personally supported Abughaush's path to the Olympics.

The Jordan Olympic Committee issued a 100,000 JD (around $141,000) award for Abughaush and a 50,000 JD (around $71,000) for his coach Faris Al-Assaf, upon their return from Rio. Queen Alia International Airport witnessed a large public celebration for Abughaush and the Olympic delegation.

References

External links

 
 

1996 births
Living people
Olympic taekwondo practitioners of Jordan
Taekwondo practitioners at the 2016 Summer Olympics
Olympic gold medalists for Jordan
Medalists at the 2016 Summer Olympics
Jordanian people of Palestinian descent
Olympic medalists in taekwondo
Sportspeople from Amman
Universiade medalists in taekwondo
Taekwondo practitioners at the 2018 Asian Games
Asian Games bronze medalists for Jordan
Asian Games medalists in taekwondo
Medalists at the 2018 Asian Games
Universiade medalists for Jordan
Jordanian male taekwondo practitioners
World Taekwondo Championships medalists
Medalists at the 2017 Summer Universiade
21st-century Jordanian people